Montrose, also known as Sibley City, is an unincorporated community in Baldwin County, Alabama, United States along the eastern shore of Mobile Bay.

Montrose is part of the Daphne–Fairhope–Foley Micropolitan Statistical Area. Montrose has two sites included on the National Register of Historic Places, the Henry Stuart House and the Montrose Historic District.

History
The community was originally known as Sibley City in honor of Cyrus Sibley, an early landowner in the area. The name was then changed to Montrose, in honor of Montrose, Scotland. A post office first opened under the name Montrose in 1879.

Notable people
 Miller Reese Hutchison (1876–1944), electrical engineer and inventor credited with developing some of the first portable electric devices, such as the vehicle horn and hearing aid.
Eric Yelding, former Major League Baseball player for the Houston Astros and Chicago Cubs.

See also
Eastern Shore

References

Unincorporated communities in Alabama
Unincorporated communities in Baldwin County, Alabama